da Maiano is the name of two Italian Renaissance brothers who worked as sculptors and  architects:

Giuliano da Maiano (c. 1432-1490)
Benedetto da Maiano (1442-1497)